Unified Canadian Aboriginal Syllabics is a Unicode block containing syllabic characters for writing Inuktitut, Carrier, Cree (along with several of its dialect-specific characters), Ojibwe, Blackfoot and Canadian Athabascan languages. Additions for some Cree dialects, Ojibwe, and Dene can be found at the Unified Canadian Aboriginal Syllabics Extended block.

Block

History
The following Unicode-related documents record the purpose and process of defining specific characters in the Unified Canadian Aboriginal Syllabics block:

References

Unicode blocks
Canadian Aboriginal syllabics